Bruyères-le-Châtel is a commune in the Essonne department in Île-de-France in northern France.

History
A nunnery was founded at Bruyères-le-Châtel by a noblewoman named Clotilde. The charter endowing the monastery is dated to 10 March 673 and is among the oldest original private charters which survive from Merovingian Francia.

Inhabitants of Bruyères-le-Châtel are known as Bruyérois.

See also
Communes of the Essonne department

References

External links

Mayors of Essonne Association 

Communes of Essonne